Taquarituba is a municipality in the state of São Paulo in Brazil. The population is 23,256 (2020 est.) in an area of 448 km². The elevation is 618 m.

References

Municipalities in São Paulo (state)